Chaetosiphon is a genus of green algae in the family Chaetosiphonaceae.

References

External links

Ulvophyceae genera
Bryopsidales